William Jordyn (c. 1566 – 1623) was briefly an English member of parliament.

Jordyn was a Member (MP) of the Parliament of England for Westbury in 1593.

References

1560s births
1623 deaths
English MPs 1593
Members of the Parliament of England for constituencies in Wiltshire